Things is a studio album by American pianist Uri Caine and Italian trumpeter Paolo Fresu which was released on the Blue Note label in 2006.

Track listing

Personnel
Uri Caine – piano, electric piano
Paolo Fresu – trumpet, flugelhorn, effects

References

Blue Note Records albums
Uri Caine albums
2006 albums